Rahmali (also Romanized as Rahmālī and Rāh Mālī) is a village in Kabgian Rural District, Kabgian District, Dana County, Kohgiluyeh and Boyer-Ahmad Province, Iran. At the 2006 census, its population was 288, in 70 families.

References 

Populated places in Dana County